Cochise College is a public college in Arizona. Founded on September 21,1964, the school has campuses in Douglas and Sierra Vista, and centers in Benson, Fort Huachuca, and Willcox. Cochise College offers associate degrees in art, applied science, business, elementary education, general studies, and science, and over 30 different certificate programs. The college also offers transfer programs for students to transfer to partner universities.

History
Cochise College was one of the first community colleges in Arizona when it was founded on September 21, 1964. The college was voted on by the citizens of Cochise County in 1961 and a 1962 bond election resulted in the construction of the Douglas Campus. With the increased growth and interest in secondary education, a second campus was opened in Sierra Vista. The new campus was originally housed in a few temporary buildings on the grounds of Buena High School in the early 1970s but opened a full scale college campus in 1978.

Campus
Cochise College is accredited by the Higher Learning Commission of the North Central Association. The college holds memberships in the Arizona Community College Association, the Council of North Central Two-Year Colleges, the American Association of Community Colleges, the Council for Higher Education Accreditation, the Hispanic Association of Colleges and Universities and the Association of Community College Trustees.

The college also holds Federal Aviation Administration certification for its professional pilot and aviation maintenance programs and Arizona Department of Health Services/Emergency Medical Services certification for its paramedicine and emergency medical technology programs. The nursing program is accredited by the Arizona State Board of Nursing and the Accreditation Commission for Education in Nursing.

The Cochise College Library system consists of two branches, the Charles Di Peso Library on the Douglas campus and the Andrea Cracchiolo Library on the Sierra Vista campus. The libraries maintain a collection of over 60,000 books and media items, including DVDs and audiobooks, to support Cochise College curriculum and lifelong learning. The Cochise College Online Library provides access to more than 8,700 magazines and scholarly journals, eBook collections containing over 100,000 titles, and 20,000 plus streaming videos.

The school is noted for having its own school-owned airport, built specifically for the college's aviation program.

Organization and administration
The college contains seven campuses and centers, each with its known founding date:

 Benson Center (2000)
 Douglas Campus (1964)
 Douglas Prison
 Downtown Center, Sierra Vista (2016)
 Fort Huachuca
 Sierra Vista Campus (1978)
 Wilcox Center (2010)

Academics
Cochise College offers 49 Undergraduate Associate Degrees in total.
Associate of Arts

 Administration of Justice
 Computer Science
 Early Childhood Care and Education
 Economics
 Exercise Science, Health and Physical Education, Recreation and Wellness
 Fine Arts
 General Requirements
 Liberal Studies
 Music
 Social and Behavioral Sciences
 Theatre Arts

Associate of Arts Elementary Education
 Elementary Education
Associate of Business

 Business Administration
 Computer Information Systems

Associate of Science

 Biology
 Chemistry
 Computer Science
 Engineering
 General Requirements
 Mathematics
 Physics

Associate of General Studies

 Aviation Dispatch
 General Studies
 Professional Pilot Technology

Associate of Applied Science

 Animal Science
 Crop Science
 Automotive Technology
 Building Construction Technology
 Business Management
 Cisco and Linux Networking
 Computer Information Systems
 Computer Programming
 Culinary Arts
 Cybersecurity
 Early Childhood Care and Education
 Education
 Electronics Technology
 Intelligence Operations Studies
 Law Enforcement
 Media Production Arts
 Network Technology
 Nursing
 Paramedicine
 Professional Pilot Technology
 Residential Construction Technology
 Respiratory Therapy
 Unmanned Aerial Vehicle Flight Operator
 Unmanned Aircraft Systems Technician
 Welding Technology

Research

Endowment
As of June 2019, the Board of Directors has designated $585,071 of net assets without donor restrictions as a general endowment fund to support the mission of the Cochise College Foundation.

Student life

On-Campus Housing
Cochise College – Douglas Campus has traditional residence halls (dorms) and town homes that can house up to 180 residents each semester.  The college welcomes students from around the state, country and world to the rural on-campus community. Students enrolled in at least 12 credits may reside on campus.  More information may be found at the college's website.

Athletics

Cochise College offers several intramural sports programs available to the student body. These include Men's and Women's Basketball, Soccer, Baseball, and Rodeo.

Women's Basketball
The members of Women's basketball team at Cochise College have been awarded multiple honors to include All National Junior College Athletic Association (NJCAA) Region 1 Division 1 honors, All Arizona Community College Athletic Conference (ACCAC) honors, All American honors, and Academic All American honors.

Accomplishments
 1984–1985 Season – Record: 25–6 (ACCAC Champions, Region 1 Champions, NJCAA National Tournament Appearance)
 2004–2005 Season – Record: 19–10 (Region 1 Runners-Up)
 2005–2006 Season – Record: 16–16 (Region 1 Runners-Up)
 2012–2013 Season – Record: 26–6 (Region 1 Runners-Up)
 2016–2017 Season – Record: 28–4 (Region 1 Champions, ACCAC Champions, NJCAA National Tournament Appearance)
 2017–2018 Season – Record: 29–3 (Region 1 Champions, ACCAC Champions, NJCAA National Tournament Appearance)
 2018–2019 Season – Record: 28–4 (Region 1 Champions, ACCAC Champions, NJCAA National Tournament Appearance)

Men's Baseball
The members of Men's baseball team at Cochise College have been awarded multiple honors to include All American honors, All Region honors, and All ACCAC honors, and Academic All American honors.

Accomplishments
 2014 Season: Western District Champions, Advanced to NJCAA World Series

People

Notable faculty and staff
 James A. Corbett born 1933, former librarian and Philosophy Professor, human rights activist and a co-founder of the Sanctuary movement
 Marsha Arzberger born 1937, Foundation Board member since 1999, former Arizona State Senator

Notable alumni and students
 Beau Allred (born 1965), former American professional baseball player
 Brayon Blake (born 1995), American professional basketball player for the Manisa Büyükşehir Belediye of the Turkish 2nd Division
 Chad Curtis (born 1968), former American professional baseball player
 Charles DeBarber, cyber threat intelligence and computer security professional
 Eric Gonzalez (born 1986), former Spanish professional baseball player
 Kevin Kouzmanoff (born 1981), former American professional baseball player, current hitting coach in the Oakland Athletics
 David Lundquist (born 1973), former American professional baseball player, current assistant pitching coach for the Philadelphia Phillies
 Carolyne Mas (born 1955), singer-songwriter, guitarist, pianist, and producer
 Nathan Sobey (born 1990), Australian professional basketball player for the Brisbane Bullets of the National Basketball League (NBL)
 LaCosta Tucker (born 1951), American country music artist

See also
 Cochise College Airport

References

Community colleges in Arizona
Buildings and structures in Cochise County, Arizona
Education in Cochise County, Arizona
1964 establishments in Arizona
Educational institutions established in 1964